Vienna Concert is a live solo piano album by American pianist Keith Jarrett recorded on July 13, 1991 at the Vienna Staatsoper in Vienna, Austria and released by ECM label in 1992. It has a forty-two-minute arch-like opening movement that exhibits a much greater debt to classical music than Jarrett's earlier improvised concerts.

In its original liner notes Jarrett himself wrote  "I have courted the fire for a very long time, and many sparks have flown in the past, but the music on this recording speaks, finally, the language of the flame itself."

Reception 
The Allmusic review by Richard S. Ginell awarded the album 4 stars, stating, "Jarrett's exalted judgment is close to the mark; though more Eurocentric than ever, these are his most impressive solo performances since Sun Bear".

Track listing 
All music by Keith Jarrett
 "Vienna, Part 1" - 42:05  
 "Vienna, Part 2" - 26:03

Total effective playing time: 66:43 (the album contains 1:25 applause approximately)

Personnel 
 Keith Jarrett – piano

Production
 Manfred Eicher and Keith Jarrett - producer
 Manfred Eicher - producer
 Peter Laenger - engineer (recording)
 Barbara Wojirsch - cover design and layout
 Kuni Shinohara - photography

References 

Keith Jarrett live albums
1992 live albums
ECM Records live albums
Albums produced by Manfred Eicher
Instrumental albums
Solo piano jazz albums